Heath High School is a public high school in Heath, Ohio.  It is the only high school in the Heath City Schools district that was founded in 1962.

Athletics
The Heath High School Bulldogs compete in the Licking County League.

The Heath Bulldogs compete in Baseball, Basketball, Bowling, Cheerleading, Cross Country, Football, Golf, Soccer, Softball, Swimming, Track & Field, Volleyball, and Wrestling.

Ohio High School Athletic Association State Championships

 Boys Baseball – 2002, 2007 
 Boys Track and Field - 2007 
 Girls Basketball – 1991 
 Girls Volleyball – 1995 
 Coed Cheerleading — 2017

External links
 District Website
 District Facebook
 Heath High School Athletics

Notes and references

High schools in Licking County, Ohio
Public high schools in Ohio